The year 1608 in music involved some significant events and new musical works.

Events
February 9 – The masque The Hue and Cry After Cupid, written by Ben Jonson and designed by Inigo Jones, is performed at Whitehall Palace. The masque features the music of Alfonso Ferrabosco the younger.
June 4 – Claudio Monteverdi's latest work, Il ballo delle ingrate, is given its first performance in Mantua as part of the wedding celebrations for Francesco Gonzaga (the son of Monteverdri's patron Duke Vincenzo of Mantua) and Margaret of Savoy.   In the same year, Monteverdi asks to be allowed to resign his post with the Gonzaga family.

Classical music
 none listed

Publications
Giovanni Francesco Anerio – Second book of madrigals for five and six voices (Venice: Giacomo Vincenti)
Costanzo Antegnati – , Op. 16 (Venice: Angelo Gardano e fratelli), a collection of intabulated ricercars for the organ
Adriano Banchieri – , Op. 18 (Venice: Ricciardo Amadino), a madrigal comedy
Giulio Belli –  for four, five, six, and eight voices with continuo (Venice: Angelo Gardano e fratelli)
Antonio Cifra – Second book of madrigals for five voices (Venice: Giacomo Vincenti)
Christoph Demantius –  for six voices and instruments (Nuremberg: Balthasar Scherff for David Kauffmann), a collection of dance music
Juan Esquivel Barahona 
First book of masses (Salamanca: Arti Taberniel)
 for four, five, six, and eight voices (Salamanca: Arti Taberniel)
Melchior Franck
 (Sacred Songs and Melodies) for five, six, and eight voices (Coburg: Justus Hauck), mostly setting texts from the Song of Songs
 for various instruments but especially violas, in six parts (Nuremberg: David Kauffmann)
 for five voices (Coburg: Kaspar Bertsch), a wedding song
 for five voices (Coburg: Kaspar Bertsch), a setting of Psalm 121
 for eight voices (Coburg: Justus Hauck)
 for seven voices (Coburg: Justus Hauck), a Christmas motet
Girolamo Frescobaldi

Marco da Gagliano – Fifth book of madrigals for five voices (Venice: Angelo Gardano e fratelli)
Bartholomäus Gesius –  for six voices (Frankfurt an der Oder: Friedrich Hartmann), a wedding motet
Gioseffo Guami – Second book of motets for choir and instruments (Milan: heirs of Agostino Tradate)
Pierre Guédron –  for four and five voices (Paris: Pierre Ballard)
Cesario Gussago – Sonatas for four, six, and eight (Venice: Ricciardo Amadino)
Hans Leo Hassler –  for four voices (Nuremberg: Paul Kauffmann), a collection of sacred songs
Robert Jones – Ultimum vale, with a triplicity of musicke...
Claude Le Jeune
Second book of 50 psalms for three voices (Paris: Pierre Ballard), published posthumously
Airs for three, four, five, and six voices (Paris: Pierre Ballard), published posthumously
Second book of airs for three, four, five, and six voices (Paris: Pierre Ballard), published posthumously
Pomponio Nenna – Seventh book of madrigals for five voices (Naples: Giovanni Battista Sotile)
Asprilio Pacelli – , book 1 (Venice, Angelo Gardano e fratelli)
Franciscus Pappus – , book 1 (Milan: Simon Tini & Filippo Lomazzo)
Vincenzo Passerini – Second book of madrigals for five voices (Venice: Ricciardo Amadino)
Orfeo Vecchi –  for five voices (Antwerp: Pierre Phalèse), published posthumously
Thomas Weelkes – Ayeres Or Phantasticke Spirites for three voices

Opera
Claudio Monteverdi – L'Arianna (mostly lost)
Marco da Gagliano – La Dafne

Births
date unknown – Francisco Lopez Capillas, Mexican composer (died 1674)

Deaths
October 26 – Philipp Nicolai, composer (born 1556)
date unknown
Luca Bati, composer (born 1546)
Peter Lupo, court musician and composer, son of Ambrose Lupo
Simone Verovio, printer of music books

References